The Seattle Mariners 1988 season was their 12th since the franchise creation, and ended the season finishing 7th in the American League West with a record of .

Offseason
 December 9, 1987: Phil Bradley and Tim Fortugno were traded by the Mariners to the Philadelphia Phillies for Glenn Wilson, Mike Jackson, and Dave Brundage (minors).
 December 21, 1987: John Moses was released by the Mariners.
 December 22, 1987: Lee Guetterman, Clay Parker, and Wade Taylor were traded by the Mariners to the New York Yankees for Steve Trout and Henry Cotto.
 January 19, 1988: John Rabb was signed as a free agent by the Mariners.

Regular season
 Mark Langston became the ace of the pitching staff as he led the club in wins (15) and strikeouts (235).

Opening Day starters
Mickey Brantley
Alvin Davis
Mike Kingery
Ken Phelps
Jim Presley
Rey Quiñones
Harold Reynolds
Steve Trout
Dave Valle
Glenn Wilson

Season standings

Record vs. opponents

Notable transactions
 May 23, 1988: John Christensen was released by the Mariners.
 June 1, 1988: Steve Balboni was signed as a free agent by the Mariners.
 June 1, 1988: Greg Pirkl was drafted by the Mariners in the 2nd round of the 1988 Major League Baseball Draft. Player signed June 6, 1988.
 June 8, 1988: Manager Dick Williams was fired and replaced by interim manager Jim Snyder.
 July 21, 1988: Ken Phelps was traded by the Mariners to the New York Yankees for Jay Buhner, Rich Balabon (minors) and a player to be named later. The Yankees completed the deal by sending Troy Evers (minors) to the Mariners on October 12.
 July 22, 1988: Glenn Wilson was traded by the Mariners to the Pittsburgh Pirates for Darnell Coles.

Major League debuts
Batters:
Greg Briley (June 27)
Bill McGuire (Aug 2)
Pitchers:
Erik Hanson (Sep 5)
Mike Schooler (June 10)
Terry Taylor (Aug 19)

Roster

Player stats

Batting

Starters by position
Note: Pos = Position; G = Games played; AB = At bats; H = Hits; Avg. = Batting average; HR = Home runs; RBI = Runs batted in

Other batters
Note: G = Games played; AB = At bats; H = Hits; Avg. = Batting average; HR = Home runs; RBI = Runs batted in

Pitching

Starting pitchers
Note: G = Games pitched; IP = Innings pitched; W = Wins; L = Losses; ERA = Earned run average; SO = Strikeouts

Other pitchers
Note: G = Games pitched; IP = Innings pitched; W = Wins; L = Losses; ERA = Earned run average; SO = Strikeouts

Relief pitchers
Note: G = Games pitched; W = Wins; L = Losses; SV = Saves; ERA = Earned run average; SO = Strikeouts

Farm system

AZL club affiliation shared with Boston Red Sox

References

External links
1988 Seattle Mariners at Baseball Reference
1988 Seattle Mariners team page at www.baseball-almanac.com

Seattle Mariners seasons
Seattle Mariners season
Seattle Mariners